Toomas Liivak (born 10 September 1970) is an Estonian retired professional basketball player. Liivak represented the Estonian national basketball team internationally.

Estonian national team
As a member of the Estonian national team, Liivak competed at the EuroBasket 2001, averaging 1 point, 0.7 rebounds and 0.7 assists in 5 minutes per game. Estonia finished the tournament in 14th place.

References

External links
 Toomas Liivak at basket.ee 
 Toomas Liivak at fiba.com

1970 births
Living people
Sportspeople from Tartu
Estonian men's basketball players
Shooting guards
University of Tartu basketball team players
Korvpalli Meistriliiga players
BC Valga players